The 18th parallel north is a circle of latitude that is 18 degrees north of the Earth's equatorial plane. It crosses Africa, Asia, the Indian Ocean, the Pacific Ocean, Central America, the Caribbean and the Atlantic Ocean.

At this latitude the sun is visible for 13 hours, 13 minutes during the summer solstice and 11 hours, 3 minutes during the winter solstice.

Around the world
Starting at the Prime Meridian and heading eastwards, the parallel 18° north passes through:

{| class="wikitable"
! width="125" | Co-ordinates
! Country, territory or sea
! Notes
|-
| 
| 
|
|-
| 
| 
|
|-
| 
| 
|
|-
| 
| 
|
|-
| 
| 
| For about 1 km
|- 
| style="background:#b0e0e6;" | 
| style="background:#b0e0e6;" | Indian Ocean
| style="background:#b0e0e6;" | Red Sea
|-
| 
| 
|
|-
| 
| 
|
|-
| 
| 
|
|-
| style="background:#b0e0e6;" | 
| style="background:#b0e0e6;" | Indian Ocean
| style="background:#b0e0e6;" | Arabian Sea
|-valign="top"
| 
| 
| Maharashtra Karnataka Andhra Pradesh Chhattisgarh Orissa Telangana
|-
| style="background:#b0e0e6;" | 
| style="background:#b0e0e6;" | Indian Ocean
| style="background:#b0e0e6;" | Bay of Bengal
|-
| 
|  (Burma)
|
|-
| 
| 
|
|-
| 
| 
|
|-
| 
| 
|
|-
| 
| 
| Passing just north of Vientiane
|-
| 
| 
|
|-
| 
| 
|
|-
| 
| 
|
|-
| style="background:#b0e0e6;" | 
| style="background:#b0e0e6;" | Pacific Ocean
| style="background:#b0e0e6;" | Passing just south of the island of Hainan, South China Sea
|-
| 
| 
| Island of Luzon
|-valign="top"
| style="background:#b0e0e6;" | 
| style="background:#b0e0e6;" | Pacific Ocean
| style="background:#b0e0e6;" | Philippine Sea Passing just south of Pagan Island,  into an unnamed part of the Ocean
|-
| 
| 
|
|-
| 
| 
|
|-
| style="background:#b0e0e6;" | 
| style="background:#b0e0e6;" | Atlantic Ocean
| style="background:#b0e0e6;" | Chetumal Bay
|-
| 
| 
| Ambergris Caye
|-
| style="background:#b0e0e6;" | 
| style="background:#b0e0e6;" | Atlantic Ocean
| style="background:#b0e0e6;" | Caribbean Sea
|-
| 
| 
| Passing through Kingston
|-
| style="background:#b0e0e6;" | 
| style="background:#b0e0e6;" | Atlantic Ocean
| style="background:#b0e0e6;" | Passing just south of the Tiburon Peninsula, Caribbean Sea
|-
| 
| 
|
|-valign="top"
| style="background:#b0e0e6;" | 
| style="background:#b0e0e6;" | Atlantic Ocean
| style="background:#b0e0e6;" | Caribbean SeaPassing just south of Saona Island,  Passing just south of Isla Mona, 
|-
| 
| 
|
|-valign="top"
| style="background:#b0e0e6;" | 
| style="background:#b0e0e6;" | Atlantic Ocean
| style="background:#b0e0e6;" | Caribbean SeaPassing just south of Isla de Vieques,  Passing between the islands of St. Thomas and St. Croix,  Passing just south of 
|-
| style="background:#b0e0e6;" | 
| style="background:#b0e0e6;" | Atlantic Ocean
| style="background:#b0e0e6;" |  Passing just north of 
|-
| 
| 
| Passing just south of Nouakchott
|-
| 
| 
|
|}

See also
17th parallel north
19th parallel north

References

n18